The Hooper Historic District, in Hooper, Nebraska, is a  historic district which was listed on the National Register of Historic Places in 1980.  The listing included 22 contributing buildings.

It mostly consists of one- and two-story commercial structures, and it includes Italianate architecture.

References

External links

Historic districts on the National Register of Historic Places in Nebraska
National Register of Historic Places in Dodge County, Nebraska
Italianate architecture in Nebraska
Romanesque Revival architecture in Nebraska